Rail transport in Ireland (InterCity, commuter and freight) is provided by Iarnród Éireann in the Republic of Ireland and by Northern Ireland Railways in Northern Ireland.

Most routes in the Republic radiate from Dublin. Northern Ireland has suburban routes from Belfast and two main InterCity lines, to Derry and cross-border to Dublin.

The accompanying map of the current railway network shows lines that are fully operational (in red), carrying freight only traffic (in black) and with dotted black lines those which have been "mothballed" (i.e. closed to traffic but potentially easy to re-open). Some airports are indicated but none are rail-connected, although Kerry Airport and Belfast City Airport are within walking distance of a railway station. Both the City of Derry Airport and Belfast International (Aldergrove) are near railway lines but not connected. Ports are marked, although few remain rail-connected. Dublin Port, Larne Harbour, Belview Port and Rosslare Europort are ports that are still connected.

Ireland's only light rail service, named Luas, is in Dublin. No metro lines currently exist in Ireland, but there is a planned MetroLink line which would serve Dublin.

History

The first railway in Ireland opened in 1834. At its peak in 1920, Ireland had  of railway; now only about one third of this remains. A large area around the border has no rail service.

Ireland's first light rail line was opened on 30 June 2004.

Rolling stock

Locomotives

Diesel traction is the sole form of motive power in both the IÉ and NIR networks, apart from the electrified Howth/Malahide-Greystones (DART) suburban route in Dublin. Apart from prototypes and a small number of shunting locomotives, the first major dieselisation programme in CIÉ commenced in the early 1950s with orders for 94 locomotives of two sizes (A and C classes) from Metropolitan-Vickers which were delivered from 1955, with a further twelve (B class) locomotives from Sulzer in the late 1950s.
Following poor reliability experience with the first generation diesel locomotives, in the 1960s a second dieselisation programme was undertaken with the introduction of sixty-four locomotives in three classes (121, 141 and 181) built by General Motors, of the United States. This programme, together with line closures, enabled CIÉ to re-eliminate steam traction in 1963, having previously done so on the CIÉ network prior to taking over its share of the Great Northern Railway. In parallel, NIR acquired three locomotives from Hunslet, of England, for Dublin-Belfast services. The Metropolitan-Vickers locomotives were re-engined by CIÉ in the early 1970s with General Motors engines.

The third generation of diesel traction in Ireland was the acquisition of eighteen locomotives from General Motors of 2475 h.p. output, designated the 071 class, in 1976. This marked a significant improvement in the traction power available to CIÉ and enabled the acceleration of express passenger services. NIR subsequently purchased three similar locomotives for Dublin-Belfast services, which was the first alignment of traction policies by CIÉ and NIR.

A fourth generation of diesels took the form of thirty-four locomotives, again from General Motors, which arrived in the early 1990s. This was a joint order by IÉ and NIR, with thirty-two locomotives for the former and two for the latter. They were again supplied by General Motors Electro-Motive Division. IÉ designated their locomotives the GM 201 class; numbered 201 to 234 (the NIR locomotives were later prefixed with an 8). These locomotives are the most powerful diesels to run in Ireland, and are of 3200 horsepower (2.5 MW), which enabled further acceleration of express services. The NIR locomotives, although shipped in NIR livery, were repainted in 'Enterprise' livery, as were six of the IÉ locomotives.

The 071 class are now used on freight services. NIR's three similar locomotives are numbered 111, 112 and 113. There is seldom more than one of these serviceable at a time.

Multiple units

NIR and IÉ both run suburban services using diesel multiple units (DMUs) – these are termed railcars in Ireland (see rail terminology).

Iarnród Éireann railcars

IÉ DMUs operate all InterCity services apart from Dublin to Cork and Dublin to Belfast (one service per week from Dublin Connolly to Belfast and back is Railcar).

Iarnród Éireann 22000 Class InterCity Railcars

There are 234 22000 Class carriages in total, being formed into the following sets:
Ten 5-car sets – Each set includes a 1st Class Carriage and a Dining Carriage. They are used on key InterCity services between Dublin and Limerick, Galway, Waterford, Westport and Tralee.
Twenty-five 4-car sets – These mostly operate on their own or with a 3-car unit. They serve lesser-used InterCity services and most Dublin to Sligo and Rosslare services.
Twenty-eight 3-car sets – These mostly operate in pairs. They serve lesser-used InterCity services and many Dublin Commuter services.

Features of the InterCity Railcar fleet include:

Automatic PA and information display systems
Electronic seat reservation displays for web bookings
Fully air-conditioned
Internal CCTV system
Sleek carriage design
Advanced safety features throughout

Iarnród Éireann commuter railcars
IÉ introduced 17 new suburban railcars in 1994 as the 2600 Class (built by Tokyu Car, Japan) for the Kildare 'Arrow' suburban service. Further additions to the fleet were made in 1997 (twenty-seven 2700 Class, Alstom built, now withdrawn), 2000 (twenty 2800 Class, Tokyu Car built) and 2003 (eighty 29000 class, CAF built). When the 29000 Class was introduced all Irish railcars were re-branded from 'Arrow' to 'Commuter'. A further nine 4-car 29000 Class trainsets arrived in 2005.

NIR railcars
NIR replaced their ageing DMUs with Class 3000 and Class 4000 regional railcars built by CAF, which arrived in 2005 and 2011, respectively.

Coaching stock

Mark 4 carriages

Iarnród Éireann's flagship InterCity fleet are the Mark 4.

Built by CAF of Spain in 2004–2005 they are formed into 8-car push-pull sets.
Each set contains (in order):
GM 201 class locomotive
5 Standard class carriages
1 restaurant carriage
1 'Citygold' (first class) carriage
Generator Control Car

The Mark 4 trains have blue tinted windows, which help to create a cool journey for the passenger, electronic route maps showing train progress, electronic seat reservation displays and power points for laptops, or recharging tablets, MP3 players or mobile phones. Citygold customers on this fleet have the added features of adjustable seating, greater room and comfort and in-seat audio entertainment. They are used exclusively on the Dublin to Cork route; operating an hourly service each way.

Enterprise services
The Dublin to Belfast 'Enterprise' service is operated jointly by IÉ and NIR with rolling stock from De Dietrich, commissioned in 1997. Four Mark 3 Generator vans were introduced in September 2012. Until then, 201 Class locomotives were required to supply head-end power (HEP) for heating and lighting.

Previous stock
NIR also had a number of refurbished Class 488 carriages acquired from the Gatwick Express service and converted to run on the Irish  gauge. These were generally referred to as 'the Gatwicks'. They were in use from 2001 until June 2009.

Passenger services
Below is a list of all passenger routes on the island of Ireland. Please note the following when examining routes:

 Services below usually, but not necessarily always, involve a change of trains. Changing points are shown in bold type.
 Services at different times of day will serve a different subset of the stations shown below. The "stations served" lists all possible stops for any train on a given route. As an example, some services to Limerick do not involve a change at Limerick Junction, and some services to Cork may stop at Limerick Junction, Charleville and Mallow only.

Republic of Ireland InterCity routes

Dublin to Cork

Stations served on this line are
 Dublin Heuston
 Portarlington
 Portlaoise
 Ballybrophy
 Templemore
 Thurles
 Limerick Junction
 Charleville
 Mallow
 Cork Kent

This was known as the 'Premier Line' of the Great Southern and Western Railway (GS&WR), being one of the longest routes in the country (266 km or 165 miles), built to a high standard and connecting to Galway, Limerick, Waterford and Kerry as well as to Cork. These other destinations all have their own services, although connections are offered to/from the Cork service at Limerick Junction (for Limerick) and Mallow (for Kerry).
As of 2019 the line is receiving a major upgrade focusing this year between Newbridge and Ballybrophy. There are possessions of most sections of the line every night to carry out relaying. There are also disruptions and cancellations on most weekends. All relaying is using a much heavier rail to give a much smoother ride on trains. The new track at 60 kg, is the same that is used on the TGV in France. As the upgrading continues there are speed restrictions which are affecting punctuality of trains. A new platform is under construction at Limerick Junction on the down line which will reduce conflicts and reduce journey times by 3–5 minutes. A fourth track is planned between Park West-Cherry Orchard and Heuston which is also intended to further reduce journey times. As of 2019, 13 out of 29 services on the route daily are delivered in 2 hours 30 mins or under. 11 trains operate the service in between 2 hours 30 mins and 2 hours 35 mins, with all services 2 hours 40 mins or less. An early morning express service from Cork to Dublin makes the non-stop journey in 2 hours 15 mins.

Dublin to Limerick
Stations served on this line are:
 Dublin Heuston
 Sallins and Naas
 Newbridge
 Kildare
 Monasterevin
 Portarlington
 Portlaoise
 Ballybrophy
 Templemore
 
 Limerick Junction
 Limerick Colbert

This service follows the Cork route as far as Limerick Junction. Limerick services leave the main line via a direct curve built in 1967, onto part of the former Waterford and Limerick Railway (W&LR). The former two hourly timetable operated by 22000 Class railcars was cut back in November 2009 when the number of direct trains was reduced to three from Dublin to Limerick and four from Limerick to Dublin. On Sunday there are 6 trains in each direction. The remaining Dublin-Limerick-Ennis services involve a change at 'Limerick Junction' from a Dublin-Cork or Dublin-Tralee service onto a local train for the remaining 30 minutes of the journey.

Dublin to Galway

Stations served on this line are:
 Dublin Heuston
 Sallins and Naas (peak times only)
 Newbridge
 Kildare
 Monasterevin
 Portarlington
 Tullamore
 Clara
 Athlone
 Ballinasloe
 Woodlawn
 Attymon
 Athenry
 Oranmore
 Galway Ceannt

The present route, built by the GS&WR in competition with the MGWR, leaves the Cork main line just after Portarlington. The River Shannon is crossed at Athlone. Athenry, the second last station before Galway, became a junction once again in 2010 with the reopening of the line to Limerick and would do so again if the planned reopening of the line to Tuam proceeds in accordance with Transport 21.  In February 2011 planning permission was obtained for a station at Oranmore and opened 28 July 2013.
All services are operated by 22000 Class railcars.

As of 2019, journey times range between 2 hours 11 minutes to 2 hours 37 minutes. 8 services operate in 2 hours 20 mins or less Monday to Friday.
There are 9 direct trains in each direction Monday–Thursday. On Friday the 07:35 express Heuston goes to Westport instead of Galway but there is a connecting train to Galway from Athlone. For the college term there is an extra service from Galway to Dublin at 15:35.

Dublin to Tralee

Stations served on this line are:
 Dublin Heuston
  (1 train on Sunday)
 Portarlington, Portlaoise
 Thurles
 Limerick Junction
 Charleville
 Mallow
 Banteer
 Millstreet
 Rathmore
 Killarney
 Farranfore
 Tralee Casement

This relatively indirect route runs along what is in essence a branch line connected to the Cork–Dublin mainline at Mallow. Trains run to/from the south of Tralee. As of 2017 there were eight trains from Mallow to Tralee and nine trains the other way around. All services are operated by 22000 Class railcars, with the exception of the very early morning service from Tralee to Cork and some Sunday services (From Tralee to Cork via Mallow) which are operated by a 2-carriage 2600 Class Commuter set. There is one service a day from Dublin Heuston to Tralee in each direction Monday to Friday. On Sunday there is two trains from Heuston to Tralee and three from Tralee to Heuston. Journey times range from 3 hours 40 minutes to 3 hours 53 minutes. On this line, Farranfore railway station provides a direct connection with Kerry Airport.

Dublin to Waterford

Stations served on this line are:
 Dublin Heuston
 Hazelhatch and Celbridge
 Sallins and Naas
 Newbridge
 Kildare
 Athy
 Carlow
 Muine Bheag
 Kilkenny MacDonagh
 Thomastown
 Waterford Plunkett

Since Kilkenny is a stub station, reversal is necessary. Non Passenger trains such as the DFDS Freight train from Ballina to Waterford avoid Kilkenny by using Lavistown loop which joins both lines going into Kilkenny. Some passenger trains use the loop to reducing the journey time.

Dublin to Westport/Ballina

Stations served on this line are:
 Dublin Heuston
 Newbridge
 Kildare
 Monasterevin
 Portarlington
 Tullamore
 Clara
 Athlone
 Roscommon
 Castlerea
 Ballyhaunis
 Claremorris
 Manulla Junction (Foxford–Ballina or Castlebar–Westport)

The line is served primarily by a 22000 Class DMU on Dublin–Westport.  On the Manulla Junction – Ballina section a 2800 Class diesel railcar operates.
There are 3 services a day from Heuston to Westport and 5 From Westport to Heuston Monday to Thursday and on Friday the 07:35 Heuston to Galway goes to Westport and the 09:08 Athlone to Westport goes to Galway and then the 17:10 Heuston to Athlone is extended to Westport and there is 5 trains from Westport to Heuston. There is also 1 service daily from Athlone to Westport Monday to Thursday. Journey times range from 3 hours 6 minutes to 3 hours 44 minutes.

Dublin to Gorey/Rosslare Europort

Stations served on this line are:
 Dublin Connolly
 Tara Street
 Dublin Pearse
 Dún Laoghaire Mallin
 Bray Daly
 Greystones
 Kilcoole (limited service)
 Wicklow
 Rathdrum
 Arklow
 Gorey
 Enniscorthy
 Wexford O'Hanrahan
 Rosslare Strand
 Rosslare Europort

There are four end to end journeys in each direction Mondays to Fridays inclusive, the first of which from Rosslare Europort extends beyond Dublin to Dundalk. An early morning Gorey to Connolly commuter service which, on its evening return, extends to Wexford also operates. On Saturdays and Sundays there are three end to end journeys each way plus a Gorey to Dundalk Commuter service. The 16:37 Dublin Connolly to Rosslare Europort Mondays to Fridays journey offers connectional opportunities into ships to Wales and France. Some peak services also stop at Lansdowne Road station as well and some services skip Kilcoole. This service has the slowest average speed at roughly 53 kilometres per hour. Services are either ICR's of 29000 commuter trains.

A resignalling project in Dublin increases the ability of Iarnród Éireann to run 12 to 20 trains per hour in both directions through the Howth Junction to Grand Canal Dock line, which caters for Howth DARTs, Malahide DARTs, Northern Commuter trains, Belfast Enterprise services, Sligo InterCity and Maynooth Commuter services, as well as other services in the Connolly to Grand Canal Dock area.

Dublin to Sligo 

Stations served on this line are:
 Dublin Connolly
 Drumcondra (peak times only)
 Maynooth
 Kilcock
 Enfield
 Mullingar
 Edgeworthstown
 Longford
 Dromod
 Carrick-on-Shannon
 Boyle
 Ballymote
 Collooney
 Sligo Mac Diarmada

All services are operated by 22000 Class railcars with a service every 2 hours until 7 pm.
The first Sunday service from Dublin is operated by 29000 Class railcars. This returns from Sligo at 6 pm.
Only peak services call at Drumcondra.

Cork to Tralee

Stations served on this line are:
 Cork Kent
 Mallow
 Banteer
 Millstreet
 Rathmore
 Killarney
 Farranfore
 Tralee Casement

This is a three times daily service with two trains departing in the morning and one in the evening. The service is run by a 22000 Class.

Farranfore railway station connects with Kerry Airport.

Limerick to Waterford

Stations served on this line are:
 Limerick Colbert
 Limerick Junction
 Tipperary
 Cahir
 Clonmel
 Carrick-on-Suir
 Waterford Plunkett

The Limerick–Waterford route is the only true non-radial (from Dublin) route still open in Ireland that is not a branch line. The route was commenced in 1848 by the Waterford & Limerick Railway and completed in 1854.

Timetabling, as of 2019, requires passengers to change at Limerick Junction.  There are two services per day, each way, with no service on Sundays or Public Holidays. Timetabled journey times vary between 2hrs35mins & 2hrs43mins.

Limerick–Ennis–Galway

Stations served on this line are:
 Limerick Colbert
 Sixmilebridge
 Ennis
 Gort
 Ardrahan
 Craughwell
 Athenry
 Oranmore
 Galway Ceannt

This service started 30 March 2010 with the reopening of the Ennis–Athenry line. Direct trains now travel from Limerick to Galway with the Ennis commuter services have been subsumed into these.

All of the new stations are unstaffed. Gort has two platforms with lifts, bridges, ticket machines and a loop while Sixmilebridge, Ardrahan and Craughwell have just one platform each. In Gort the signal cabin has been restored and relocated and there is a small depot for permanent way crew. This reopening was the Phase One of the reopening of the Western Rail Corridor. It involved the relaying of 58 km of track, rebuilding bridges, installation of signalling systems, level crossing upgrades and building the stations. The journey time between Limerick and Galway is just under 2 hours and there are 5 trains each way daily.

The line has seen some growth, with the Irish Times reporting that from 2013 to 2014, "the western rail corridor saw a 72.5 per cent increase from 29,000 to 50,000 journeys through the Ennis–Athenry section of the line", which was partly attributed to the introduction of online booking and promotional fares.

Republic of Ireland commuter routes

Dublin Suburban Rail

 Dublin Area Rapid Transit (DART) – Greystones to Howth/Malahide.
 Northern Commuter – Dublin Pearse to Dundalk
 South Eastern Commuter – Dublin Connolly to Gorey.
 South Western Commuter – Dublin Heuston/Grand Canal Dock to Portlaoise/Newbridge.
 Western Commuter – Dublin Pearse/Docklands to Maynooth/M3 Parkway/Longford.

Mallow to Cork

Cóbh to Cork

Midleton to Cork

Galway to Athenry

Limerick to Ennis

Stations served on this line are:
 Limerick Colbert
 Sixmilebridge
 Ennis

Limerick to Nenagh and Ballybrophy

Stations served on this line are:
 Limerick Colbert
 Castleconnell
 Birdhill
 Nenagh, Cloughjordan
 Roscrea
 Ballybrophy

The line branches from the Waterford line just outside Limerick at Killonan Junction. All trains on this line connect with Dublin trains at Ballybrophy.

Current services on the line consist of two return passenger trains a day from Limerick. Following a campaign by The Nenagh Rail Partnership founded by local politicians and community representatives and assisted by the Internet news group Irish Railway News, a market research survey was funded by local Government. The market research was carried out in the summer of 2005 and showed there existed a market for improved services on the line. As a result of this study IÉ has committed to allocating additional rolling stock to the line as part of its ongoing fleet replacement programme. This line is subject to many speed restrictions due to the need to replace several old sections of track.

In October 2007, following a meeting between Iarnród Éireann management and The Nenagh Rail Partnership, it was confirmed that the new commuter service would be introduced between Nenagh and Limerick on Monday 1 September 2008. This was launched as planned on Monday 1 September 2008.

A news report in January 2012 suggested that Iarnród Éireann might seek permission from the National Transport Authority to close the line, but in February 2012 an enhanced timetable for the line was published, indicating that a decision to close has been deferred pending the outcome of the service upgrade.

Waterford to Rosslare (closed)

Stations served on this line were:
 Waterford Plunkett
 Campile, Ballycullane
 Wellingtonbridge
 Bridgetown
 Rosslare Strand
 Rosslare Europort

There was a single service each way on the Waterford-Rosslare stretch, operated by 2700 Class railcars taking just over 1 hour. The original purpose of the service, providing a railway link to the cities of Waterford, Limerick (and Cork via Limerick Junction) was compromised in the end by poor connections to other services from Waterford.

The service closed for passenger services on 18 September 2010. Replacement transport consists of a revised schedule and routings on the existing Bus Éireann route 370. Buses on the route are branded "370 Connect", to Waterford Bus Station which is a 5-minute walk from Waterford Railway Station.

The line is still open for stock transfers. 22000 Class and 29000 Class DMUs operated on the line on 5 November 2011.

Northern Ireland routes

Services in Northern Ireland are sparse in comparison to the Republic or other countries. A large railway network was severely curtailed in the 1950s and 1960s (in particular by the Ulster Transport Authority). Routes now include suburban services to Larne, Newry and Bangor, as well as services to Derry. There is also a branch from Coleraine to Portrush. On Northern Ireland Railways distances are quoted in miles and metres.

Belfast suburban

Three suburban routes run on 20-minute frequencies in and out of Belfast Great Victoria Street railway station, these routes then pass through Belfast Central railway station before continuing onto destinations at Bangor, Derry, Larne and Newry.

Belfast to Derry

Stations served on this line are:
 Great Victoria Street
 City Hospital
 Botanic
 
 Yorkgate (partial service)
  (partial service)
 Mossley West
 
 
 
 
 
 
 
 

The service to Derry has suffered from a lack of funding over recent decades. The existing line is not continuously welded and has speed restrictions in parts.  For some time the threat of closure hung over this route but a funding package of £20 million was confirmed in December 2005. The same month saw the introduction of the new CAF railcars on the line and despite the fact that the service remained slower than the Derry-Belfast Ulsterbus service, the improvements saw a rise in passenger numbers to over 1 million per annum. However, these in 2007 when it was revealed that the £20 million earmarked had not been spent while there had been a £20 million overspend on the Belfast–Bangor line, and the "Into the West" rail lobby group had proposed extending the line cross border into County Donegal to Letterkenny and then on to Sligo, thus releasing EU funding.
Currently, the department has partly completed a plan in place for Regional Development, for relaying of the track between Derry and Coleraine by 2013, which includes a passing loop, and the introduction of two new train sets. The £86 million plan is expected to reduce the journey time between Belfast and Derry by 30 minutes and allow commuter trains to arrive in Derry before 0900 for the first time.

Coleraine to Portrush

Stations served on this line are:
 
 University
 Dhu Varren

Belfast to Larne Harbour

Stations served on this line are:
 Belfast Great Victoria Street
 City Hospital
 Botanic
 
 Yorkgate
 Whiteabbey
 Jordanstown
 Greenisland
 Trooperslane
 Clipperstown
 Carrickfergus
 Downshire
 Whitehead
 Ballycarry
 Magheramorne
 Glynn
 Larne Town
 Larne Harbour

Cross-border routes

Belfast–Dublin and Dublin–Belfast

Stations served on this line are:
 
 Lisburn
 Portadown
 Newry
 Dundalk Clarke
 Drogheda MacBride
 Dublin Connolly

This cross border service, named Enterprise, is jointly owned and run by Northern Ireland Railways and IÉ.  Despite having some of the most modern InterCity rolling stock on the island, it has been dogged by numerous problems. An historical problem on this route has been disruption to services caused by security alerts (devices on the line, hoax devices, threats and warnings).  These continue to the present day.

The punctuality on this service remains poor for other reasons. The InterCity route, despite being mostly high quality continuous welded rail, is shared with suburban services outside both Belfast and Dublin.

A further problem was due to the locomotive and rolling stock arrangements. Unlike most other locomotive-hauled rolling stock in Ireland, generator vans were not part of the train – even the DVTs did not supply power. Thus the General Motors-built locomotives had to supply head-end power for lighting and heating throughout the train. Although many types of locomotive are well designed for this purpose, these particular locomotives had struggled under the extra strain. The wear on the locomotives and time out of service were unusually high. On at least two occasions locomotives had burst into flames while shuttling along the route. To avoid further damage, four Mark 3 Generator Vans entered service in September 2012.

The collapse of the Malahide Viaduct in late 2009 temporarily stopped all Enterprise services from Dublin to Belfast for 3 months. The viaduct was repaired and the line re-opened in November 2009.

Freight

The following freight services operate in Ireland :
Timber trains from Ballina to Waterford Port (Belview)
Timber trains from Westport to Waterford Port (Belview)
Zinc ore from Tara Mines, Navan – Dublin Port (North Wall)
International Warehousing and Transport chartered Liner from Ballina – Dublin Port (North Wall) (Started September 2009)

Rail freight in Ireland declined in the early 21st century, and IÉ closed its container rail freight business in July 2005, saying that the sector had accounted for 10% of its freight business, but 70% of its losses. Container freight levels had dropped to c.35 containers on three trains per day. Yet Iarnród Éireann estimated that a minimum of eighteen 40-foot containers was needed for a commercially viable trainload.  The impact of this will be about forty more lorries a day, described by Iarnród Éireann as a 'drop in the ocean' when compared to the 10,000 lorries entering Dublin Port every day.

Freight services no longer running include ammonia trains (from Shelton Abbey, Wicklow–Cork due to the closure of a fertiliser plant), nationwide bagged cement and beer keg freight, gypsum loads (Kingscourt–Dublin), and bulk cement (from cement factories at Platin near Drogheda and Castlemungret near Limerick to silos at Sligo, Athenry, Cabra, Cork, Waterford, Tullamore and Belfast).

Other losses included services carrying fertilisers, grain, tar, scrap metal, molasses and coal. The last bulk cement flow to operate in Ireland (Castlemungret – Waterford) ended in December 2009 along with the Kilmastulla Quarry – Castlemungret Shale traffic, despite making profits in the region of €1.3 million in 2006.

Remaining freight traffic is supported by an agreement with Coillte to increase timber trains from Ballina to Belview from three to four weekly. This may reflect the failure of the railway to dispose of its surplus Class 201 locomotives made surplus by the retirement of the Mark 3 coach fleet.

Bord na Móna operates an extensive  narrow-gauge railway. This is one of the largest industrial rail networks in Europe and is completely separate from Ireland's passenger rail system operated by Iarnród Éireann. It is used to transport peat from harvesting plots to processing plants and power stations of the Electricity Supply Board.

Rail interest groups and museums

Ireland has a small heritage railway scene, with some substantial and long-running groups operating, while most are small affairs. There are a couple of railtour-operating groups, one  self-contained railway, and a few groups with short lines.

Heritage railways and bodies
Heritage bodies in Ireland include the Railway Preservation Society of Ireland which is based in Whitehead, County Antrim and also has an operational base in Dublin. It runs preserved steam trains on several main lines around Ireland. Other bodies include the Irish Traction Group, which preserves diesel locomotives including an example at Carrick-on-Suir station, four at Moyasta, and five at the DCDR.

Heritage railways include the:
 Cavan and Leitrim Railway, which has 0.4km of 3ft gauge track and a small transport museum, located next door to Iarnród Éireann's Dromod railway station.
 Difflin Lake Railway, a 4.5km 15inch gauge railway at Oakfield Park, near Raphoe, County Donegal.
 Downpatrick & County Down Railway, the only self-contained full-size heritage railway in Ireland, running trains along its 4miles of track in addition to its static museum.
 Fintown Railway, which runs a former County Donegal Railways Joint Committee (CDRJC) railbus along the shore of Lough Finn.
 Giant's Causeway and Bushmills Railway, a recreation of the original Giant's Causeway Tramway. Steam running ceased at the railway in 2012 with the arrival of a new-build tram.
 Peatlands Park Railway, which formerly ran peat trains but now instead carries passengers.
 Stradbally Woodland Railway, run by the Irish Steam Preservation Society.
 Waterford and Suir Valley Railway, which runs 10km of 3ft gauge line between Kilmeadan and Waterford.

Interest and record groups
The Irish Railway Record Society has a library of Irish railway documents at Heuston station and charters an annual railtour. The Modern Railway Society of Ireland promotes interest in modern-day Irish Railways and charters occasional railtours.

Museums
There are a number of  museums and restored railway stations, holding a range of rail vehicles and other equipment.
 Belturbet Railway Station, County Cavan, which is fully restored and has several items of rolling stock.
 Arigna Mining Experience, County Roscommon, has two 3ft gauge carriages.
 Clonakilty Model Village, County Cork, which has a Ruston diesel and two Park Royal carriages.
 Cork Railway Station is home to No. 36, the oldest surviving steam locomotive in Ireland.
 Donegal Railway Heritage Centre, a museum dedicated to the County Donegal Railways Joint Committee housed in the former Donegal railway station.
 Lartigue Monorail in Listowel, an accurate demonstration of Ireland's only monorail system.
 Dundalk Railway Station has a small museum incorporated into the waiting room.
 Dunsandle Railway Station, which is fully restored and has several items of rolling stock.
 Farrangalway Railway Station, home to an unrestored Waterford, Limerick and Western Railway six-wheeled carriage.
 Foyle Valley Railway in Derry, which closed in 2015 but reopened in 2016.
 Halfway Vintage Club, which has a brake van, beet wagon and Ruston diesel shunter.
 Guinness Brewery in Dublin has a few examples of stock from its former private narrow gauge system on display.
 Kiltimagh Railway Station, County Mayo, which has two restored carriages.
 Lullymore Heritage Railway, a former peat railway on a mineral island in County Kildare.
 National Transport Museum of Ireland at Howth Castle has several tramway vehicles.
 Ulster Folk and Transport Museum contains various railway and tramway vehicles of numerous gauges from across Ireland.
 West Clare Railway, with a collection of 5ft3in and 3ft stock based in the restored 'Moyasta junction' station.

Former heritage railways and interest groups 
 Clonmacnoise and West Offaly Railway, which closed in 2008.
 Shane's Castle Railway, County Antrim, which ran from 1971 to 1994/5, and was partly reused at the Giant's Causeway.
 Tralee and Blennerville Railway, which closed in 2006, though the line still exists.

Planned and potential developments

Routes

Western Rail Corridor 
The first stage of the reopening of the Western Rail Corridor, between Ennis and Athenry, was completed in 2009. As of 2020, the remaining stages, from Athenry to Tuam, Claremorris and Collooney, are not planned to be reopened.

Heavy rail to Navan
Iarnród Éireann had proposed extending existing commuter services from M3 Parkway railway station to Navan via Dunshaughlin. However, as of late 2019, this proposal was deferred subject to "review".

DART and DART Underground

A proposed tunnel, connecting Heuston Station and Pearse Station and onwards to the Northern Commuter line, referred to as the DART Underground, is not planned to see any development until sometime "after 2042".

Foynes Port
The Shannon Foynes Port Company has been seeking reinstatement of the Limerick to Foynes Railway Line, which last operated in 2000, as part of their expansion plans. The company have commissioned a design for reinstatement by Irish Rail, however no funding was in place as of 2020. A tender was published in July 2022 for the reconstruction of the line.

Dublin Metro

MetroLink is proposed to run from Estuary on Dublin's northside to Beechwood via Dublin Airport and St. Stephen's Green. Its route proposes mainly elevated tracks in the Swords area, with a tunnel running from north of Dublin Airport to Charlemont.

Luas
There have been, at various points, plans or proposals to extend Luas to Swords, Dublin Airport, Lucan, Bray, and Old Fassaroe.

There have also been proposals to create a Luas system in Cork City. These first date from when the Fianna Fáil government first considered the proposal in 2007 at the urging of coalition partners, the Green Party. They were abandoned after the recession began later in the year. 
Plans were revisited by the Cork City Council in 2017, and were also considered once more as part of the Fine Gael government's Ireland 2040 proposals.

Northern Ireland Railways
The potential to reopen a number of railway lines in Northern Ireland has included speculation on such lines as the line between Antrim and Castledawson.

The reopening of the third line between Great Victoria Street and Adelaide may be tied into the proposed Belfast Transport Hub.

In July 2020, during a North/South Ministerial Council meeting, it was proposed to undertake a feasibility study on a possible high-speed line between Belfast-Dublin-Cork.

Station changes
In February 2018 the Irish Independent reported the National Transport Authority favoured building four new DART stations along the line to Heuston, including Cabra, Glasnevin, the Docklands and Woodbrook. Calls to open or reopen stations on existing lines have included proposals for Kishoge railway station, which (as of 2019) was structurally complete but had yet to be opened.

In Northern Ireland, Translink have proposed new transport hubs in both Belfast and Derry.

Rolling stock
In 2017, increasing demand led Iarnród Éireann to issue tenders for the refurbishment of 10 2700 class sets, which had been held in storage for 6 years with the intention of planned use around Limerick from early 2019. The displaced trains are intended for use in the Greater Dublin Area.

As of early 2018, Iarnród Éireann proposed to place an order for new DART stock capable of running off diesel or electric.

As of 2018, NI Railways had plans to invest in a third wave of new trains to meet growing demand.

As of 2018, a campaign was underway to preserve four 80 Class vehicles at the Downpatrick and County Down Railway, with hopes of bringing them to the heritage railway by the end of 2018. Also in 2018, one of the two Cavan and Leitrim Railway steam locomotives, No. 3 ''Lady Edith'', was proposed to be repatriated by the West Clare Railway (from the New Jersey Museum of Transportation).

See also

 Heritage railways in Northern Ireland
 Heritage railways in the Republic of Ireland
 Irish Sea Tunnel
 Rail Users Ireland
 Rail gauge in Ireland

References

External links

 Website of Iarnrod Éireann (Irish Rail)
 Website of Northern Ireland Railways
 Railway Procurement Agency
 Platform For Change (Dublin Transportation Office)
 Strategic Rail Review 2003 (Department of Transport)
 Rail Users Ireland – Ireland's National Rail User organisation
 Eiretrains – Irish Railways Past & Present